Horatio Walker   LL.D. (May 12, 1858 – September 27, 1938) was a Canadian painter. He worked in oils and watercolours, often depicting scenes of rural life in Canada. He was influenced by the Barbizon school.

Life and work

Early life

Walker was born in 1858 to parents Thomas and Jeanne Maurice Walker. Thomas Walker emigrated in 1856 from Yorkshire, England, to Listowel, Ontario, with his wife of French and English heritage. Thomas purchased land for lumber in Midwestern Ontario and Horatio was raised in relative comfort. His interest in art may originate from his father who crafted small figures as a hobby, and both his father and the local school teacher encouraged drawing as a pastime.

In 1870, on Walker's 12th birthday, his father brought him to Quebec City, Quebec, for the first time. His father made occasional business trips to the city as part of his timber business. During this sojourn, they visited the Île d'Orléans, in search of pine timber. Walker made subsequent visits to Quebec City during the following years. His formal schooling ended at the Listowel Public School in 1872; he never went on to pursue formal academic training in art. At the age of 15, Walker moved to Toronto, Ontario to apprentice with the photographic firm Notman and Fraser. It was a fortunate opportunity, as several successful artists also worked there; Walker learned watercolour from Robert Ford Gagen, miniature portrait painting from John Arthur Fraser, and painting from Lucius Richard O'Brien and Henri Perré.

Mature life and career

Walker was only at the firm for three years until he moved to the United States of America for uncertain reasons. Writing in 1928, Hector Charlesworth suggested that Walker was "chucked down the stairs" and fired for quarrelling with a family relative. However, it is more likely that Walker travelled to Philadelphia for the American Centennial in 1876, an exhibition where Notman and Fraser won the international award, which gave the firm the privilege of exclusive photographic rights for the celebrations. Ultimately, Walker may have decided to stay and pursue painting.

During the period of Walker's life around 1878, he would have become familiar with the painters of the Barbizon school, which were at the time, exhibited in American museums and galleries. In 1880, Walker made an extended trip to Europe to learn more about Barbizon methods, and its agrarian subject matter, that would come to define his painting for the rest of his life.

What happened with Walker during the two following years remains vague, but in 1878, he opened a studio in New York City. During the 1880s, Walker's parents moved to Rochester, New York, and Walker participated in the founding of the Rochester Art Club. A further sign of Walker's growing success was an invitation to join the American Watercolour membership in 1882. In 1883 he married Jeanette Pretty (died 1938) of Toronto. They had two children, Alice (1884–1891) and Horatio Jr. (1886–1910). It was sometime during this period that Walker purchased a residence on Île d'Orléans in the village of Sainte-Pétronille. From now on until his retirement, Walker would spend his summers in Quebec and winters in his New York City studio.

Walker's personal life was disastrous: his daughter died of diphtheria, his son of tuberculosis and his wife Jeanette, was committed to hospital permanently in 1914 due to paranoia. These tragedies do not seem to have influenced his painting; Walker's subject matter and style remained constant throughout his career without much variation.

Memberships and organizations

Walker was a member of several artists' organizations, including the American Watercolor Society (1882), the Royal Canadian Academy of Arts (associate member in 1883, full member in 1913), the Society of American Artists (1887), the National Academy of Design (associate member in 1890, full member in 1891), and the British Institute of Watercolours (1901). He was a founding member of the Canadian Art Club, which elected him as its president in 1915. In 1928 he officially retired and moved to Sainte-Pétronille, Quebec. He died there on September 27, 1938.

Awards and prizes

 Gold medals, American Art Gallery, New York (1887, 1889)
 Evans Prize, American Watercolor Society (1888)
 Bronze medal, World Exposition, Paris, France (1889)
 Gold medal, World's Columbian Exposition, Chicago, Illinois (1893)
 Gold medal, Pan-American Exposition, Buffalo, New York (1901)
 Gold medal, Charleston Exposition, Charleston, South Carolina (1902)
 Two gold medals (for oil and watercolor), Louisiana Purchase Exposition, St. Louis, Missouri (1904)
 Medal of honor, Pennsylvania Academy of Fine Art, Philadelphia, Pennsylvania (1906)
 First prize, Worcester Art Museum, Worcester, Massachusetts (1907)
 Gold medal, Pan-Pacific International Exposition, San Francisco, California (1915)

He was awarded honorary doctorates from the University of Toronto (1916) and Université Laval, Québec City (1938).

Walker has been designated as an Historic Person in the Directory of Federal Heritage Designations.

Selected works

A Canadian Pastoral
After the Wedding
An Old Islander
At Low Tide
Ave Maria
Boeuf à l'abreuvoir
By the Fireside
Canoe Cove
Célestin
Corner of Pig Lane in Québec
Corner of Sainte-Pétronille
Corner of the Stable
De Profundis
Deo Gratias
Église de l'Île-aux-Grues
Fagot Gatherers
Farmhouse Interior
First Snow
Fishing Nets
Girl with Turkeys
Golden Dew
Hauling the Log
Hauling Wood
Hay Making

Horses at Trough
Ice Cutters
Interior of a House
Killing Pigs
La Rencontre
La soue à cochons
La tonte du mouton
Le vieux four
Little White Pigs and their Mother
Man Sawing Wood
Maple Sugar Harvest
Mare and Foal
Milk Maid Île d'Orléans
Milking Early Morn
Milking on the Batture
Morning Île d'Orléans
Morning Sainte-Pétronille
Old House at Sainte-Famille
Oxen drinking
Oxen Ploughing
Peasant Scraping Pig
Pétronille de Saint-François
Potato Gatherers
Preparing the Feed

Sheep Shearers
Spring Forage
The Bake Oven
The Farmer's Wife
The Gardener
The Harrow
The Rainbow
The Return
The Royal Mail
The Sheep Fold
The Shepherdess
The Smugglers
The Sorcerers
The Thresher
The Turkey Girl
Tournant la herse
Tree Fellers
Turkeys
Turning the Harrow
Unloading Hay Boat
Vieille Maison à Ste-Famille
Way-Side Shrine at Saint-Laurent
Winter
Wood-Cutters

Notes

References

Farr, Dorothy. Horatio Walker 1858–1938. Kingston: Agnes Etherington Art Centre, 1977
Gravel, Lyne. Les Oeuvres d’Horatio Walker. Quebec: Musée du Québec, 1987
Harper, Russell. Painting in Canada: A History 2nd ed. Toronto: University of Toronto Press, 1981. 
Karel, David. Horatio Walker. Québec: Fides, 1986.
Price, Newland F. Horatio Walker. New York and Montreal: Louis Carrier Co., 1928.
 Reid, Dennis A Concise History of Canadian Painting 2nd Edition. Toronto: Oxford University Press, 1988. .

External links

Dozens of works of Horatio Walker reproduced at the Quebec History site of Marianopolis College
Biography of Horatio Walker from Museum London
Artist Gallery: Paintings and Drawings from the National Gallery of Canada
Virtual Museums Canada Horizons Exhibit: Canadian and Russian Painters (1860–1940).

1858 births
1938 deaths
19th-century Canadian painters
Canadian male painters
20th-century Canadian painters
Landscape artists
People from Perth County, Ontario
Artists from Ontario
Persons of National Historic Significance (Canada)
Members of the Royal Canadian Academy of Arts
Members of the Royal Institute of Painters in Water Colours
19th-century Canadian male artists
20th-century Canadian male artists
Canadian landscape painters